William Edmund Hunt (born 25 November 1934) is an English former professional footballer who played as a centre half for Colchester United.

Biography
Born in Colchester in Essex, Hunt signed for Colchester in 1955, having been an apprentice at the club. He made his début against Southend United on 27 August 1955. However, this was his only appearance for Colchester, before leaving to join Sudbury Town the following year.

References

Living people
1934 births
Sportspeople from Colchester
English footballers
Association football central defenders
Colchester United F.C. players
Sudbury Town F.C. players